Parliamentary elections were held in Slovenia on 15 October 2000. The result was a victory for Liberal Democracy of Slovenia, which won 34 of the 90 seats. Following the election, Liberal Democracy leader Janez Drnovšek returned to the post of Prime Minister.

Results

References

Slovenia
2000 in Slovenia
Parliamentary elections in Slovenia
October 2000 events in Europe